Keith Willis (born July 29, 1959) is a former American football defensive lineman in the National Football League (NFL) and currently the defensive line coach and defensive run coordinator for the North Carolina A&T of the NCAA.  He played for the Pittsburgh Steelers and wore #93.

External links
 Boston College Eagles bio
 NC State Wolfpack bio

1959 births
Living people
American football defensive ends
Northeastern Huskies football players
Pittsburgh Steelers players
Buffalo Bills players
Washington Redskins players
New York Jets players
Cincinnati Bearcats football coaches
Boston College Eagles football coaches
NC State Wolfpack football coaches
Players of American football from New Jersey
Montreal Alouettes coaches
Tennessee Titans coaches
Ed Block Courage Award recipients